Roy Chukwuemeka Nnawuchi, better known by his pseudonym Dean Blunt, is a British singer-songwriter, musician and contemporary artist. He is best known for his current solo work as well as his previous work as part of avant-garde duo Hype Williams (along with Inga Copeland), and more recently, the hip hop group Babyfather. Blunt was also the founder of London rock band Graffiti Island. He has been described as "a prolific, category-rejecting artist" and "an art-pop provocateur."

Life and career 
Although little is known about his personal life, Blunt has said he comes from a London family that he describes as "Sun readers, working class, kind of ignorant in ways".

Blunt performed music with Russian-born artist Inga Copeland (also known as Lolina) as the electronic duo Hype Williams from 2007 until 2012. Supposedly founded in 2005 as a "relay" project passed between artists every five years, the group has given few interviews, leaving music journalists and the media in doubt as to the exact nature of the project. The group's lineup has remained obscure, although Blunt's artistic style has been heard within newer releases, and a variety of other names have also been invoked as members. A mysterious representative named Denna Frances Glass has alternately been posited as either the manager of the project or a fake identity created by Blunt and Copeland. In 2016, Glass announced that Blunt and Copeland were no longer part of the project, which would be continuing with other members.

Blunt embarked his solo career in 2011, releasing a set of albums as well as several EPs and singles. His first few full-length studio albums, The Narcissist II (2012), The Redeemer (2013), and Black Metal (2014), received attention and praise from various music publications. BBF Hosted By DJ Escrow, his first album as Babyfather, was named the best album of 2016 by Tiny Mix Tapes and Resident Advisor.

In 2018, Blunt contributed heavily to ASAP Rocky's album Testing, with production and writing credits on "Purity" and "Gunz N Butter" and additional vocals on "Calldrops". Blunt's work on the album followed collaborative singles between the two artists prior, such as the Babyfather track "Benzo Amore". The pair have since collaborated on multiple recordings.

Blunt is also known for his playfulness and obfuscation. In 2015, he sent his bodyguard to accept his Philip Hall Radar Award at the NME Awards. In 2016, he listed a toy Foxtons estate agents Mini Cooper filled with marijuana on eBay. At a New York concert, in March 2016, media guests were asked to check in under aliases that they had received with their ticket confirmations.

Blunt has directed music videos for Actress and Panda Bear.

Blunt has produced theatre works including The Narcissist at HAU1 in Berlin in 2012; Lord Knows at Le Romandie in Lausanne in 2013; and I’m Just Passin Thru To Show Some Love in 2013 and Urban in 2014, both at the Institute of Contemporary Arts in London. In October 2017, Blunt also debuted Inna, an opera directed by himself with music from Mica Levi, at the same institute.

Blunt has put on a number of art exhibitions, including New Paintings at the Triangle and W44VY at Arcadia Missa. He has also published a book compiling "excessive expenses made in the most popular VIP clubs in the hip hop scene", entitled Cîroc Boyz: Vol 1.

Blunt practises Transcendental Meditation and is a vocal proponent of it. In a 2016 interview with i-D, he said: "Transcendental Meditation is an effortless practice that brings a lot. Pareto. The hardest thing to remember is how simple it is. Focusing too much on the mantra defeats the objective."

Discography

Solo
 Jill Scott Herring OST (2011)
 The Narcissist (mixtape) (2011)
 The Narcissist II (mixtape) (2012)
 The Redeemer (2013)
 Каменный Остров (Stone Island) (mixtape) (2013)
 Skin Fade (mixtape) (2014)
 Black Metal (2014)
 Babyfather (mixtape) (2015)
 Soul on Fire (mixtape) (2018)
 ZUSHI (mixtape) (2019)
 Roaches 2012-2019 (compilation) (2020)
 Black Metal 2 (2021)

As Part of Babyfather
 UK2UK (mixtape) (2015)
 Platinum Tears (mixtape) (2016)
 BBF Hosted By DJ Escrow (2016)
 419 (mixtape) (2016)
 Cypher (mixtape) (2017)

Other
 Black Is Beautiful (with Inga Copeland) (2012) 
 Wahalla (with Joanne Robertson) (2017)
 Hotep (as part of Blue Iverson) (2017)
 Muggy Vol.1 (producer of a compilation on Dean Blunt's World Music imprint) (2018)
 Desert Sessions (with Delroy Edwards) (2018)

As part of Hype Williams

Awards and nominations

References

External links
Unofficial Dean Blunt page on VK

Living people
English male singer-songwriters
21st-century Black British male singers
English people of Nigerian descent
Musicians from London
Art rock musicians
Art pop musicians
English experimental musicians
English bass guitarists
English male guitarists
Five percenters
Male bass guitarists
English record producers
Rough Trade Records artists
People from the London Borough of Hackney
Date of birth missing (living people)
Year of birth missing (living people)